The second season of the American crime thriller television series The Blacklist premiered on NBC on September 22, 2014, and concluded on May 14, 2015, and ran for 22 episodes. The season was produced by Davis Entertainment, Universal Television, and Sony Pictures Television, and the executive producers are Jon Bokenkamp, John Davis, John Eisendrath, John Fox, and Joe Carnahan.

Premise 
The second season follows Reddington's war with The Cabal, a shadowy multinational group that holds positions of influence in government and business, over The Fulcrum, a digital repository of information about The Cabal's illegal activities that both parties want. The season introduces Samar Navabi (Mozhan Marnò), a former agent of the Mossad and new member of the Task Force with a connection to Reddington. The first part of the season sees the resolution of Red's conflict with Milos Kirchoff, AKA Berlin. The second half of the season introduces a new series antagonist Peter Kotsiopulos (David Strathairn), the ruthless Director of the National Clandestine Service (AKA The Director) and a key member of The Cabal, who seeks possession of The Fulcrum at any cost.  The season also follows Elizabeth Keen's investigation into Tom's double life and the subsequent breakup of their marriage. Liz ends up being tried over her involvement in a murder committed by Tom and the subsequent cover up.  Ultimately Liz and Tom reconcile but Liz ends up on the run from the FBI and the Task Force after killing Tom Connolly (Reed Birney), the U. S. Attorney General and secret member of The Cabal.

Cast

Main cast
 James Spader as Raymond "Red" Reddington
 Megan Boone as Elizabeth Keen
 Diego Klattenhoff as Donald Ressler 
 Ryan Eggold as Tom Keen
 Harry Lennix as Harold Cooper
 Amir Arison as Aram Mojtabai
 Mozhan Marnò as Samar Navabi

Recurring cast
 Hisham Tawfiq as Dembe Zuma.
 Reed Birney as Thomas "Smiling Tommy" Connolly, Assistant Attorney General.
 Lance Henriksen as The Major, Tom Keen's former mentor and trainer.
 Adriane Lenox as Reven Wright, Deputy Attorney General 
 Susan Blommaert as Mr. Kaplan, Reddington's personal "cleaner".
 Peter Stormare as Berlin, real name Milos Kirchoff, Reddington's nemesis in the first season.
 Alan Alda as Alan Fitch, Assistant Director of National Intelligence.
 Mary-Louise Parker as Naomi Hyland/Carla Reddington, Reddington's ex-wife.
 Scottie Thompson as Zoe D'Antonio, Berlin's daughter.
 Hal Ozsan as Ezra, a personal guard assigned to Elizabeth by Reddington.
 Ron Perlman as Luther Braxton, a high-profile international thief.
 David Strathairn as "The Director", the mysterious head of the National Clandestine Service (NCS). 
 Janel Moloney as Kat Goodson, the liaison between the NCS and the FBI.
 Clark Middleton as Glen Carter, a DMV employee occasionally employed by Reddington to retrieve information.
 Chandler Williams as Elias, member of the Disenfranchised.
 David Patrick Kelly as Elias's right-hand man.
 Ned Van Zandt as Leonard Caul, a security expert and creator of the Fulcrum.
 Dikran Tulaine as Max, a skilled bomb maker and longtime acquaintance of Red's

Episodes

Reception
The second season of The Blacklist received positive reviews from critics. The review aggregator website Rotten Tomatoes reports an 80% approval rating based on 15 reviews, with an average score of 7.77/10. The consensus reads: "Though The Blacklist flirts with narrative overload, it's held together by James Spader's scenery-eating performance and wildly entertaining action".

Ratings

References

External links
 
 

2014 American television seasons
2015 American television seasons
2